The Divisiones Regionales de Fútbol in the Community of Asturias, organized by Real Federación de Fútbol del Principado de Asturias:
Primera RFFPA, formerly Regional Preferente de Asturias (Level 6 of the Spanish football pyramid)
Segunda RFFPA, formerly Primera Regional de Asturias (Level 7)
Tercera RFFPA, formerly Segunda Regional de Asturias (Level 8)

League chronology
Timeline

Primera RFFPA (formerly Regional Preferente de Asturias)

Primera RFFPA is one of the lower levels of the Spanish Football League. It stands at the sixth level of Spanish football. All of the clubs are based in the autonomous community of Asturias.

The League 
The league consists of 20 teams in one group. At the end of the season, three teams are promoted to Tercera División RFEF – Group 2. The last three classified are relegated to Segunda RFFPA (formerly Primera Regional de Asturias).

Since the 2018–19 season, the champion of the league qualifies for the Copa del Rey.

2022–23 teams

Latest promoted teams

Segunda RFFPA (formerly Primera Regional de Asturias) 

Segunda RFFPA is the seventh level of the Spanish football league system. It is administered by the Royal Asturias Football Federation.

League format
The league is played in two groups of 18 teams each. At the end of the season, the two champions are promoted with the winner of promotion playoff of runners-up (three teams in total). Three clubs in each group are relegated to Tercera RFFPA (six in total).

2022–23 teams

Tercera RFFPA (formerly Segunda Regional de Asturias) 

Tercera RFFPA is the eighth level of the Spanish football league system. It is also administered by the Royal Asturias Football Federation.

League format
The league is played in four groups, three of 14 teams and one of 15. At the end of the season, the four champions are promoted to Segunda RFFPA with the two winners of promotion playoff (six teams in total).

2022–23 teams

Femenino Regional

Femenino Regional de Asturias is the regional women's league and the lowest division. It stands at the fifth level of Spanish women's football. All the clubs are based in the autonomous community of Asturias.

The league 
For the 2023–24 season, Femenino Regional de Asturias will be split in two new competitions: Primera RFFPA Femenina (fifth tier) and Segunda RFFPA Femenina (sixth tier). Primera RFFPA Femenina will be made up by 10 teams, including relegations from Primera Nacional. For the current season, Femenino Regional de Asturias has two different stages. At the end of the first one, 12 teams (champions, runners-up and the two best third classified) will play in Grupo A. The other 12 teams will conform Grupo B.

After the second stage, A8, A9 and A10 will run a play-out against B1, B2 and B3 (single game). A11, A12 and the rest of the teams from Grupo B will be relegated to Segunda RFFPA Femenina.

2022–23 teams

Latest seasons 
In bold, champions and runners-up that promoted to Primera Nacional.

External links
Real Federación de Fútbol del Principado de Asturias

Divisiones Regionales de Fútbol
Football in Asturias